Christopher Sanders (born April 22, 1973) is a former American football running back in the National Football League for the Washington Redskins.  He played college football for Texas A&M University.

1973 births
Living people
Players of American football from Austin, Texas
American football running backs
Texas A&M Aggies football players
Washington Redskins players